Balinac is a village in the municipality of Knjaževac, Serbia. At the 2002 census, the village had a population of 38 people.

References

Populated places in Zaječar District